The Alston Formation is a geologic formation in England. It preserves fossils dating back to the Viséan to Serpukhovian (Asbian, Brigantian and Pendleian in British stratigraphy) stages of the Carboniferous period.

See also 
 List of fossiliferous stratigraphic units in England

References

Further reading 
 J. G. Donald. 1895. The genus Murchisonia and its allies. Quarterly Journal of the Geological Society of London 51(2):210-234

Geologic formations of England
Carboniferous System of Europe
Carboniferous England
Serpukhovian
Viséan
Limestone formations
Carboniferous southern paleotropical deposits